Luke E. Steckel (born April 28, 1985) is an American football coach and former player who is the assistant offensive line coach for the Chicago Bears of the National Football League (NFL). He played college football at Princeton and got his first coaching job with the Cleveland Browns in 2009.

Early life and education
Steckel was born on April 28, 1985, in Boston, Massachusetts. Steckel's family moved multiple times while he grew up, as his father Les, was a coach in the National Football League (NFL). He attended high school at Brentwood in Tennessee. He played linebacker and was named team captain as a senior. In his final game, the state championship, Steckel intercepted a pass at the end of the game to seal a 10–7 win. He was offered multiple scholarships following high school, including from Penn and Yale. He accepted an offer from Princeton on February 3, 2003. In 2005, he made six tackles as a member of special teams. He became co-captain on defense in his senior season, 2006.

He moved to Los Angeles, California after college and worked as a production assistant in the films All About Steve and Fast & Furious.

Coaching career
Steckel was hired as an assistant to the head coach by the Cleveland Browns of the National Football League (NFL) on January 26, 2009. He spent four seasons with the Browns from 2009 to 2012 before going to the Tennessee Titans. He served as an offensive assistant with them from 2013 to 2016, he also was a special assistant to the head coach in 2013. He was promoted to assistant wide receivers coach for the  season. Steckel was reverted to offensive assistant the following year and held the position until 2021, when he was promoted to tight ends coach.

Steckel was hired by the Chicago Bears as assistant offensive line coach in 2023.

Personal life
Luke married Lindsay Spieler in June 2018. Luke has two siblings, Lesley, a graduate of Baylor University and Christian, also a Baylor graduate, who is lead sports anchor for WAPT-TV, the ABC affiliate in Jackson, Mississippi, and works college basketball games for ESPNU. Luke's uncle, Dave Steckel just like his father is a football coach and is the former head coach of the Missouri State Bears football team and previously served under Gary Pinkel at Missouri.

References

External links
Tennessee Titans bio

1985 births
Living people
Sportspeople from Boston
Players of American football from Boston
Coaches of American football from Massachusetts
Players of American football from Tennessee
Coaches of American football from Tennessee
American football linebackers
Princeton Tigers football players
Cleveland Browns coaches
Tennessee Titans coaches
Chicago Bears coaches